is an oil-fired thermal power station operated by Tohoku Electric in the city of Akita, Akita, Japan. The facility is located overlooking the Oga Peninsula on the  Sea of Japan coast of Honshu. It also conducts remote monitoring of the four geothermal power plants Tohokou Electric operates.

History
The Akita Thermal Power Station was built to provide baseline power to the Tohoku region of Japan, including Akita Prefecture. Unit 1 came online in August 1970, followed by Unit 2 in February 1972, Unit 3 in November 1974 and Unit 4 in July 1980.

Due to aging equipment and a decline in demand, Unit 1 was scrapped in December 2003. Unit 3 was likewise abolished in September 2019. Unit 2 has been taken offline for maintenance, but is not expected to restart. The remaining Unit 4 is also in the process of being phased out.

Due to damage to the nation-wide grid caused by the 2011 Tōhoku earthquake and tsunami, an emergency Unit 5 was rushed into operation in 2012. This unit was originally scheduled to be abolished in September 2018; however, due to unusually severe winter conditions and greater-than-anticipated demand, it was kept on line to Match 2019. After it was scrapped, the gas turbine used at this plant was sent to be installed at the Higashi Niigata Thermal Power Station, Unit 4–1.

Plant details

See also 

 Energy in Japan
 List of power stations in Japan

External links

Tohoku Electric list of major power stations

1970 establishments in Japan
Oil-fired power stations in Japan
Buildings and structures in Akita (city)
Energy infrastructure completed in 1970